Hibbertia auriculiflora is a species of flowering plant in the family Dilleniaceae and is endemic to northern parts of the Northern Territory. It is usually a short-lived perennial shrublet covered with hairs and scales and has mostly oblong to linear leaves. The flowers are usually arranged singly or in groups of two or three in leaf axils, with twenty-five to thirty-two stamens arranged in groups around the two carpels.

Description
There are twenty-five to thirty-two stamens arranged in groups around the two densely scaly carpels, each carpel with two ovules. Flowering occurs from April to May.

Taxonomy
Hibbertia auriculiflora was first formally described in 2010 by Hellmut R. Toelken in the Journal of the Adelaide Botanic Gardens from specimens he collected above the falls on Waterfall Creek in 2004. The specific epithet (auriculiflora) means "earlike-appendage flowered", referring to the spreading tips of the sepal lobes.

In the same paper, Toelken described two subspecies, and the names are accepted by the Australian Plant Census:
 Hibbertia auriculiflora Toelken subsp. auriculiflora;

Distribution and habitat
This hibbertia grows in sandy soil on sandstone in woodland on the Arnhem Land escarpment in the northern parts of the Northern Territory.

Conservation status
Goodenia auriculiflora subsp. auriculiflora is classified as of "near threatened" but subsp. minor is listed as of "least concern" under the Northern Territory Government Territory Parks and Wildlife Conservation Act 1976.

See also
List of Hibbertia species

References

auriculiflora
Flora of the Northern Territory
Plants described in 2010
Taxa named by Hellmut R. Toelken